Pag Oras Mo, Oras Mo Na is a 2000 Philippine action film directed by Augusto Salvador. The film stars Phillip Salvador, Sunshine Cruz and Joko Diaz.

Cast
 Phillip Salvador as Capt. Victor de Leon
 Sunshine Cruz as Atty. Montero
 Joko Diaz as Ferrer
 Ace Espinosa as Santos
 Chuck Perez as Marko
 Jun Aristorenas as Chief Francisco Salvador
 Mandy Ochoa as Dario
 Jaime Fabregas as Señor Sanchez
 Via Veloso as Miriam
 Sylvia Sanchez as Jean de Leon
 Emil Sandoval as Maceda
 Jimwell Stevens as Recto
 Bob Soler as Gen. Montero
 Rudy Meyer as Gen. Alarcon
 Rene Hawkins as Mang Pikong
 Cris Vertido as Chinese Drug Lord
 Edwin Reyes as Reyes
 Denver Razon as Elmer
 Mark Anthony Wilson as Junior de Leon
 Crisdor Perez as Eric
 Joanne Salazar as Nenita
 Ronald Asinas as Truck Driver
 Ronnie Francisco as Miriam's Lover
 Aurora Dalay as Eric's Yaya
 Marie Punzalan as Gen. Alarcon's Mistress
 Boy Gutierrez as Doctor
 Ed Aquino as Gen. Padilla
 Genaro Punzalan as Gen. Despa

Production
The film had a working title Games of the Generals.

References

External links

2000 films
2000 action films
Filipino-language films
Philippine action films
Viva Films films
Films directed by Augusto Salvador